Erode Venkata Krishnasamy Sampath Elangovan is an Indian politician who is a current member of the Tamil Nadu Legislative assembly from Erode East Assembly constituency. He previously represented the Gobichettipalayam lok sabha constituency of Tamil Nadu and was Textiles Minister in Government of India (2004 -2009), in Prime Minister Dr Manmohan Singh Government. He is a member of the Indian National Congress party.

Early life
He is the son of E. V. K. Sampath and grandson of Periyar E. V. Ramasamy's brother Krishnasamy.

Political career 
In the 2009 Lok Sabha election, he lost to A. Ganeshamurthi of the MDMK by 49,336 votes in Erode constituency. He was appointed President of Tamil Nadu Congress Committee by All India Congress Committee Chief Sonia Gandhi on 31 October 2014, followed by the resignation of B. S. Gnanadesikan. In the 2019 Lok Sabha election he lost to O. P. Ravindranath Kumar, the son of O. Panneerselvam, in Theni. Elangovan was the only candidate of the UPA to lose in the 2019 Lok Sabha elections in Tamil Nadu. He was also elected as a Member of Legislative Assembly in Tamilnadu from Sathyamangalam Assembly constituency in 1984 and Erode East constituency in a by-election in 2023, due to the death of his son Thirumagan Evera.

Elections contested and positions held

Lok Sabha elections

Tamil Nadu Legislative elections

References 

Living people
Indian Tamil people
Lok Sabha members from Tamil Nadu
1948 births
India MPs 2004–2009
Union ministers of state of India
Indian National Congress politicians from Tamil Nadu
Union Ministers from Tamil Nadu
United Progressive Alliance candidates in the 2014 Indian general election
People from Erode district
People from Tiruppur district

Tamil Nadu MLAs 1985–1989